The time period in China from the founding of the People's Republic in 1949 until Mao's death in 1976 is commonly known as Maoist China and Red China. The history of the People's Republic of China is often divided distinctly by historians into the Mao era and the post-Mao era. The country's Mao era lasted from the founding of the People's republic on 1 October 1949 to Deng Xiaoping's consolidation of power and policy reversal at the Third Plenum of the 11th Party Congress on 22 December 1978. The Mao era focuses on Mao Zedong's social movements from the early 1950s on, including land reform, the Great Leap Forward and the Cultural Revolution. The Great Chinese Famine, one of the worst famines in human history, occurred during this era.

1949: Proclamation of the People's Republic of China 
The founding of the People's Republic of China (PRC) was formally proclaimed by Mao Zedong, the Chairman of the Chinese Communist Party, on October 1, 1949, at 3:00 pm in Tiananmen Square in Beijing. The establishment of the Central People's Government of the PRC, the government of the new nation, was officially declared during the proclamation speech at the founding ceremony. A military parade took place during the foundation ceremony.

Early 1950s: Social revolution

The People's Republic of China was founded on a land that was ravaged by a century of foreign invasion and civil wars. Both urban and rural communities, as well as both agriculture and industry, experienced significant growth between 1949 and 1959. Mao's government carried out land reform, instituted collectivisation and implemented the laogai camp system.

Economically, the country followed up on the Soviet model of five-year plans with its own first five-year plan from 1953 to 1957. The country went through a transformation whereby means of production were transferred from private to public entities, and through nationalization of industry in 1955, the state controlled the economy in a similar fashion to the economy of the Soviet Union.

Korean War

China's role in the Korean war has been evaluated by each participant in sharply different ways.  Soon after its founding, the newly born People's Republic of China was drawn into its first international conflict. On June 25, 1950, Kim Il-sung's North Korean forces crossed the 38th parallel, invaded South Korea, and eventually advanced as far as the Pusan Perimeter in south-east Korea. United Nations forces entered the war on side of the South, and American General Douglas MacArthur, having forced a Communist retreat, proposed to end the war by Christmas 1950. The Soviet Union and China saw a UN (and consequently, American) victory as a major political victory to the United States, a prospect seen as dangerous in the beginnings of the Cold War. However, Stalin had no desire to go to war with the United States, and left China the responsibility of saving the regime in Pyongyang. Up to this time, the Truman Administration was thoroughly disgusted with the corruption of Chiang Kai-shek's government and considered simply recognizing the PRC. On June 27, the US 7th Fleet was sent to the Taiwan Straits both to prevent a Communist invasion of the island and to prevent an attempted reconquest of the mainland. China meanwhile warned that it would not accept a US-backed Korea on its border. After the UN forces liberated Seoul in September, Beijing countered by saying that ROK troops could cross into North Korea, but not American ones. MacArthur ignored this, believing that the South Korean army was too weak to attack on its own. After Pyongyang fell in October, the UN troops approached the strategically sensitive Yalu River area. China responded by sending waves of troops south, in what became known as the People's Volunteers in order to disassociate them from the PLA. The Chinese army was poorly equipped but contained many veterans of the civil war and the conflict with Japan. In addition, it possessed huge reserves of manpower.
The United States was on its way to the height of military power, and historians contend that Mao's participation in the war asserted China as a new power to not be taken lightly. Known as the Resist America, Aid Korea Campaign in China, the first major offensive of the Chinese forces was pushed back in October, but by Christmas 1950, the "People's Volunteer Army" under the command of Gen. Peng Dehuai had forced the United Nations to retreat back to the 38th Parallel. However, the war was very costly to the Chinese side, as more than just "volunteers" were mobilised, and because of the lack of experience in modern warfare and the lack of modern military technology, China's casualties vastly outnumbered that of the United Nations. On 11 April 1951, a U.S. Seventh Fleet destroyer approached close to the port of Swatow (Shantou), on the southwest coast of China, provoking China to send an armada of more than forty armed powered junks to confront and surround the destroyer for nearly five hours before the destroyer departed the area without either side widening the conflict by initiating hostile fire. Declining a UN armistice, the two sides fought intermittently on both sides of the 38th Parallel until the armistice was signed on July 27, 1953. The Korean War ended any possibility of normalised relations with the United States for years. Meanwhile, Chinese forces invaded and annexed Tibet in October 1950. Tibet had been nominally subject to the Chinese emperors in past centuries, but declared its independence in 1912.

Under Mao's direction, China built its first atomic bomb in its nuclear program, Project 596, testing it on October 16, 1964 at Lop Nor; it was the fifth country to conduct a successful nuclear test.

1953–1957

The Korean War had been enormously costly to China, especially coming on the heels of the civil war, and it delayed postwar reconstruction. In 1949, Mao Zedong declared that the nation would "lean to one side", meaning that the Soviet Union and the communist bloc would be its principal allies. Three months after the PRC was established in October 1949, Mao and his delegation traveled to Moscow. They were not received warmly by Stalin, who doubted if they really were Marxist-Leninists and not simply a group of Chinese nationalists. He had also recognized Chiang Kai-Shek's government, and furthermore distrusted any communist movement that was not under his direct control. After a meeting with Mao, the Soviet leader remarked "What sort of a man is Mao? He seems to have some idea of revolution involving the peasants, but not the workers." Eventually, a frustrated Mao was ready to go home, but Zhou Enlai refused to leave without a formal agreement. Thus, the Sino-Soviet Treaty of Mutual Friendship was signed and the Chinese at last departed in February 1950.

According to Hua-yu Li, writing in Mao and the Economic Stalinization of China, 1948–1953 in 1953, Mao, misled by glowing reports in History of the Communist Party of the Soviet Union (Bolshevik): Short Course, authorized by Stalin of social and economic progress in the Soviet Union, abandoned the liberal economic programs of "New Democracy" and instituted the "general line for socialist transition", a program to build socialism based on Soviet models. He was reportedly moved in part by personal and national rivalry with Stalin and the Soviet Union.

The Soviet Union provided considerable economic aid and training during the 1950s. Many Chinese students were sent to study in Moscow. Factories and other infrastructure projects were all based on Soviet designs, for China was an agrarian country with little established industry. In 1953, Mao Zedong told the Indonesian ambassador that they had little to export except agricultural products. Several jointly owned Sino-Soviet corporations were established, but Mao considered these to impinge on Chinese sovereignty and in 1954 they were quietly dissolved.

By 1956, Mao was becoming bored with the day-to-day running of the state and also worried about growing red tape and bureaucracy. The 8th Party Congress that year declared that socialism had more-or-less been established and so the next few years would be devoted to rest and consolidation.

In February 1957, Mao gave one of his most famous addresses in which he said, "Let a hundred flowers bloom, let a hundred schools of thought contend." The Hundred Flowers Campaign was promoted by the CCP as a way of furthering socialist ideology through open debate, but many took it as an invitation to express open disdain for the Communist Party. Many began to voice their opposition to the Party-State's rule. Thoroughly shocked, Mao put an end to this and then launched the Anti-Rightist Campaign. Scores of intellectuals and common workers were purged, jailed, or disappeared. Many were not "rehabilitated" until the 1970s.

Great Leap Forward

Mao's social and cultural programs, including collectivization, were most popular in the early 1950s. However, China's strained relations with new Soviet leader Nikita Khrushchev and newfound contradictions between the Chinese and Soviet schools of communism seeded a novel and radical drive to reform China's economic system in its entirety. This split developed after Stalin's death in 1953 when new Soviet leader Nikita Khrushchev denounced him. The "secret speech" in 1956 stunned the communist world. China rejected de-Stalinization and in fact displayed large Stalin portraits at the May Day celebrations that year. Mao declared that despite some faults, Stalin had basically been a good, well-meaning Marxist. He felt that the Soviets were not treating China as an equal partner. Cultural differences also contributed to friction between the two communist giants. Khrushchev's idea of peaceful competition with the United States rather than overt hostility did not resonate well with Beijing. Mao said that "Do you think the capitalists will put down their butcher knife and become Buddhas?"

Khrushchev's 1958 suggestion of a joint Sino-Soviet fleet to counter the US 7th Fleet was angrily rejected by Mao Zedong, who told the Soviet ambassador "If you want to talk about joint cooperation, fine. We can practice joint cooperation in government, military, cultural, and economic matters and you can leave us with a guerrilla force." When the Soviet premier himself visited China the following year, Mao again asked him to explain what a joint fleet was. He stated that the Soviets were not welcome to put any troops on Chinese soil in peacetime and added "Listen carefully. We have worked long and hard to drive out the Americans, the British, the Japanese, and others. Never again will we allow foreigners to use our territory for their purposes." Khrushchev also thought that the Chinese were too soft on the Dalai Lama (Tibet's spiritual leader) and failed to support them in a border dispute with India, saying that the territory in question was "just a frozen waste where nobody lives."

Under Mao's leadership, China broke with the Soviet model and announced a new economic program, the "Great Leap Forward", in 1958, aimed at rapidly raising industrial and agricultural production. Specific to industrial production, Mao announced the goal of surpassing the steel production output of Great Britain by 1968. Giant cooperatives, otherwise known as people's communes, were formed. Within a year almost all Chinese villages had been reformed into working communes of several thousand people in size, where people would live and work together as envisioned by an ideal communist society. Rather than build steel mills, small "backyard furnaces" would be used.

The results, however, were disastrous. Normal market mechanisms were disrupted, agricultural production fell behind, and people exhausted themselves producing shoddy, unsellable goods. Because of the reliance on the government providing and distributing food and resources and their rapid depletion due to poor planning, starvation appeared even in fertile agricultural areas. From 1960 to 1961, the combination of poor planning during the Great Leap Forward, political movements incited by the government, as well as unusual weather patterns and natural disasters resulted in widespread famine and many deaths. A significant number of the deaths were not from famine but were killed or overworked by the authorities. According to various sources, the resulting death toll was likely between 20 and 40 million. The steel produced in backyard furnaces at low temperatures proved to be useless. Finally, the peasants hated the lack of privacy and the militarization of their lives.

One of the loudest opponents of the GLF was Defense Minister Peng Dehuai.  Peng was a believer in orthodox Soviet-style economic planning and totally against experimentations. Several years earlier, he had been instrumental in trying to develop the PLA into a well-equipped, professional fighting force, as opposed to Mao's belief that soldiers who were revolutionary enough could overcome any obstacle. The army had had no ranks during the civil war and Korea. This system worked rather poorly in those conflicts, and so a rank system (modeled after the Soviet one) was implemented in 1954.

While taking a trip through the countryside, Peng was horrified at the wreckage of the Great Leap Forward. Everywhere fields were dotted with abandoned communes, ruined crops, and lumps of useless pig iron. Afterwards, he accused Mao of being responsible for this disaster and was in turn denounced as a rightist and removed from office. Peng then lived retired in disgrace for the next several years until he was arrested and beaten by Red Guards during the Cultural Revolution. He survived the torture, but sustained permanent injuries and died in 1974. After Mao's death, Peng was posthumously rehabilitated with full honors.

The already strained Sino-Soviet relationship deteriorated sharply in 1959, when the Soviets started to restrict the flow of scientific and technological information to China. The dispute escalated, and the Soviets withdrew all of their personnel from China by August 1960, leaving many construction projects dormant. In the same year, the Soviets and the Chinese began to have disputes openly in international forums. The relationship between the two powers reached a low point in 1969 with the Sino-Soviet border conflict, when Soviet and Chinese troops met in combat on the Manchurian border.

Cultural Revolution

The disaster of the Great Leap Forward decreased Mao's stature as national leader and even more so as an economic planner. Mao was subject to criticism within the Central Committee. Few were as vocal as Peng Dehuai had been, but the general consensus was that the chairman's grand experiment had failed completely. In the early 1960s, President Liu Shaoqi, CCP Secretariat leader Deng Xiaoping, and Premier Zhou Enlai took over direction of the party and adopted pragmatic economic policies at odds with Mao's communitarian vision, and disbanded communes, attempting to rework the system to pre-Leap standards. Private handicrafts and street vendors were permitted, and peasants could sell surplus crops for profit after meeting their state production quotas. Living in semi-retirement, Mao continued to make occasional public appearances and voice his opinion on various issues, but played little active part in the daily management of the country from 1961 to 1964. Newspapers printed sarcastic comments about the chairman and frequently used his name in the past tense. Deng, Zhou, and Liu all seem to have concluded that Mao's policies were irrational and so they would run things while using him as an empty symbol for the people to rally around. Dissatisfied with China's new direction and his own reduced authority, Mao became increasingly annoyed. He complained that "They're invoking my name like a dead ancestor." and that landlords and capitalists were regaining power. The fall of Khrushchev in the Soviet Union also left Mao concerned that that might eventually be his fate.

As far as foreign policy was concerned, relations with the United States continued to be hostile. The US still maintained that the Nationalists were China's rightful government even though the possibility of their retaking the mainland became smaller every year. Taiwan also occupied China's seat at the United Nations, and in 1962, Mao suddenly became fearful of a Nationalist invasion. The American and Chinese ambassadors met in Warsaw, Poland (as the US had no embassy in China) and the latter were assured that no American-backed reconquest was planned.

President Kennedy felt that US policy towards China was nonsensical and he planned to restore relations in his second term. But his assassination, followed by the Vietnam War and the Cultural Revolution, ended any chance for the next several years.

Angry polemics with the Soviet Union continued during the early 1960s. Mao Zedong argued that Khrushchev's emphasis on material development would soften the people and cause them to lose their revolutionary spirit. The Soviet leader countered by saying "If we could promise the people nothing but revolution, they would scratch their heads and say 'Isn't it better to have good goulash?'" However, much of this hostility was directed at Khrushchev personally and after his expulsion from power in October 1964, the Chinese tried to mend relations. A few weeks later, Zhou Enlai headed a delegation to Moscow for the 47th anniversary of the 1917 revolution. They returned home disappointed when Leonid Brezhnev and Alexei Kosygin said that they would repudiate some of Khrushchev's more eccentric policies, but that they had no intention of turning the clock back to the time of Stalin. Despite this, relations with the USSR remained amicable until the Cultural Revolution and China continued to send representatives to the anniversary celebration of the 1917 revolution up to 1966. The Cultural Revolution had been officiated by the Mao and the CCP by then, and at the celebrations that November, one Soviet politician remarked, "What's going on now in China is neither Marxist, cultural, or revolutionary."

Mao began a drive to regain power in 1963 when he launched the Socialist Education Movement, and in 1965 he attached a certain playwright who made a stage play that indirectly attacked him. This play featured a wise official (implied to be Peng Dehuai) who was removed from office by a foolish emperor (implied to be Mao). Mao appointed his wife Jiang Qing (an actress by trade) as Minister of Culture and put her to work purging art and literature of feudal and bourgeoisie themes. Assisting the chairman in this campaign was Lin Biao, who had succeeded Peng Dehuai as defense minister in 1960. Lin had been an important army commander in the 1930s, but struggled with ill health and did not participate in the expulsion of Chiang Kai-shek from the mainland in 1946-1949 or the Korean War. Army ranks were once again abolished. The new movement, termed the "Great Proletarian Cultural Revolution", was in theory an extension of the class struggles that were incomplete from the last revolution. Mao and his supporters contended that the "liberal bourgeoisie" and "capitalist roaders" continued to dominate society, and some of these so-called dangerous elements were present within government, even the highest echelons of the Communist Party. The movement was unprecedented in human history. For the first (and thus far, only) time, a section of the Chinese communist leadership sought to rally popular opposition against another leadership group, leading to massive social, cultural, political, and economic chaos that plagued the country for a ten-year period. The Cultural Revolution was formally inaugurated at a mass rally in Beijing during August 1966. Students wearing army uniforms were dubbed "Red Guards" and instructed to go through the country and eliminate capitalists and revisionists. To assist them, millions of copies of "Select Quotations from Chairman Mao" were printed. This soon-to-be famous book contained excerpts from all of Mao's major speeches from the 1930s to 1957, but not placed in any chronological order.

Among the first targets of the Cultural Revolution were Deng Xiaoping and Liu Shaoqi. Deng was stripped of his party membership and labeled a revisionist and a capitalist roader. He wrote a self-criticism and was banished to the countryside, but in time he would rise again. Liu was far less lucky. Mao seems to have had an exceptional hatred for him, and 
he was denounced as "China's Khrushchev" and "a traitor, renegade, and scab". The hapless Liu was imprisoned and allowed to slowly waste away from untreated pneumonia and diabetes. He finally died in November 1969, but the outside world was not aware of this until a Hong Kong newspaper reported his death in 1974.

Meanwhile, the Red Guards began turning China's major population centers upside down as teachers, party officials, and anyone in power could be attacked. By the end of 1966, the army began intervening to restore order. Battles were fought, damaging cities and killing or injuring thousands. Mao then tried to restrain the army, and the Red Guards went back on the rampage. His wife proved to be one of the worst instigators, egging the Red Guards on with fiery speeches. Trains carrying weapons intended for Vietnam were looted, along with army barracks, and in some places Red Guards split into factions and fought each other in the streets with machine guns and artillery. It became so bad by August 1967 that people had to carry two or three copies of Mao's Little Red Book in public to avoid being attacked. Revolutionary committees took over the purged city governments, but they had no idea of how to govern and soon came into conflict with even more extreme youths. Books printed before 1949 were destroyed, foreigners attacked, and the British embassy in Beijing burned. Many temples and historical treasures were destroyed. Zhou Enlai ordered army units placed around some temples and other ancient structures to protect them. Even the army itself became divided, and local military chiefs gained control of some provinces where they ruled like the feudal warlords of past eras. Young people wandered through the vast countryside on foot in journeys sometimes lasting months. With China in a state of virtual anarchy in late 1967, Mao had to concede defeat. By now, the regular army began restoring order. Violence was not totally contained until late in 1968, but by then many Red Guards were banished to the countryside and labeled "anarchists" and "class enemies". Some of their ringleaders were tried and executed. The cities had no functioning governments by this time and no public services. Sick or injured people could not receive medical treatment because all the doctors had been purged, and bodies could not be buried if someone died. The streets were filled with youths who had nowhere to go.

Amid all this, Mao's personality cult reached enormous heights. Although he had always had one, it did not reach excessive levels until the Cultural Revolution, where all sorts of miracles were attributed to people who read his writings.

China became almost totally cut off from the outside world in the late 1960s and only retained diplomatic relations with a few countries. The United States was denounced for imperialism, Britain for colonialism, Japan for militarism, and the Soviet Union for revisionism. Most of the communist world was stunned and horrified by the Cultural Revolution. This led to China dividing fellow communist nations into three groups. Cuba, Romania, North Korea, and North Vietnam were classified as "mostly socialist with a few mistakes". The USSR, Mongolia, Poland, Czechoslovakia, Bulgaria, East Germany, Hungary, and Yugoslavia were classified as revisionists who pursued a false socialism. China itself and Albania were seen as the only true socialist countries in the world.

As the Cultural Revolution spun out of control, and grew past Mao's original intentions, Mao's ability to control the situation, and in turn, his authority, dwindled. His chief lieutenants, Lin Biao and Mao's third wife Jiang Qing, had manipulated the turmoil in these areas to glorify Mao to a godlike status while ignoring some of his directives. Mao's Little Red Book published over 350 million copies during the era. For the first time since the Puyi Abdication had people come to hail Mao as to "Long Live for Ten Thousand Years", which ironically is an old, feudal tradition reserved for Emperors. Lin Biao, having gained Mao's trust, had his name codified into the Constitution of both the State and Party as Mao's designated successor.

The 9th Party Congress met in Beijing during April 1969. The effects of the Cultural Revolution were obvious, as most of the delegates who had attended the 8th Congress in 1956 were gone. Green army uniforms were in abundance, as were all sorts of Mao portraits, Little Red Books, and other paraphernalia. Economic issues were mostly ignored, and all emphasis was on glorifying Mao. Lin Biao was formally designated his successor and Liu Shaoqi expelled from the party. The Red Guards were also discredited. However, Mao stated that in a few years a new Cultural Revolution might be necessary and added "No one should think everything will be all right after one, or two, or even three Cultural Revolutions, for socialist society occupies a considerably long historical period."

Lin Biao and the Gang of Four
Radical activity subsided by 1969, but the Chinese political situation began to antagonize along complex factional lines. CCP vice-chairman Lin Biao, who had ailing health and de facto control over the military, became increasingly at odds with Mao over the idea of power sharing. In private, he was not enthusiastic about the Cultural Revolution, calling it a "cultureless revolution" and also opposed restoring relations with the United States, which Mao and Zhou were then preparing to do. He attempted a military coup in September 1971, aimed at the assassination of Mao while traveling on his train. Operating out of the headquarters in Shanghai, Lin was informed of his failure after Mao's apparent diversion of routes.  Lin then escaped with his wife Ye Qun and son Lin Liguo on a military jet, and was on his way to the Soviet Union, before crashing in Ondurhan in Mongolia in September 1971. Lin's death was put tightly under wraps by the Chinese government, who had in the past vociferously praised Lin. Lin's coup and death were both subject to widespread controversy, and historians are still unable to properly determine the ins and outs of what went on. There are theories, for example, that Mao or Premier Zhou Enlai had ordered the plane to be shot down. Lin's supporters made their way out of the country, mostly to Hong Kong. Lin's flight affected Mao deeply, and he was yet again left with the dilemma of reasserting an heir apparent. Because of his past mistakes, amongst other factors, Mao was reluctant to designate any more successors, which only clouded the political situation further. After Lin Biao's death, he and the late Liu Shaoqi were turned by the state propaganda machine into a two-headed monster that could be blamed for all of China's ills.

In the aftermath of the Cultural Revolution, all independence of thought in China was stamped out. The major cities became grim places where everyone wore matching blue, green, white, black or gray suits. No ornamentation was allowed, and even bicycles all had to be painted black. Art and culture were reduced to Jiang Qing's handful of revolutionary plays, movies, and operas. Mao's personality cult remained prominent, although it was toned down somewhat after Lin Biao's death. In 1965, China had had a large, complex state bureaucracy, most of which had been destroyed during the chaos of 1966–1968. Only a small central core remained of the government in Beijing. Despite this, during the visit of Nixon in 1972, Mao Zedong told him "We haven't even begun to establish socialism. All we've really done so far are change a few localities in Beijing." Meanwhile, US president Richard Nixon had taken office in 1969 and announced his willingness to open relations with the People's Republic of China. His overtures were initially ignored and he was denounced in Beijing as a feudal chieftain whom the capitalist world turned to out of desperation. However, in August 1971, Secretary of State Henry Kissinger led a secret delegation to Beijing. They were not given a warm welcome and the hotel rooms they stayed in were equipped with anti-American pamphlets. However, they met Zhou Enlai, who spoke of how President Kennedy had wanted to open relations with the PRC and said "We're willing to wait. If these negotiations fail, eventually another Kennedy or Nixon will come along." He stated that the US had snubbed and isolated China for the last two decades, not the other way around, and that any initiative to establish relations would have to come from the American side.

Mao Zedong had apparently decided that the Soviet Union was far more of a danger than the United States. As stated above, the Cultural Revolution had caused a total breakdown in relations with Moscow. Soviet leader Leonid Brezhnev was referred to as "the new Hitler" and during the late '60s, both nations accused each other of neglecting their people's living standards in favor of defense spending, being a tool of American imperialism, pursuing a false form of socialism, and of trying to get the world blown up in a nuclear war. The United States was also separated from China by thousands of miles of ocean, while the Soviet Union had a very long border where they stationed troops and nuclear missiles. The 1968 Prague Spring worried China deeply, as the Soviets now claimed the right to intervene in any country that was deviating from the correct path of socialism. But the March 1969 clashes along the Manchurian border were what really drove the Chinese Communists to open ties with the US.

President Nixon made his historic trip to Beijing in February 1972 and met with Zhou and Mao. The trip caused some confusion in the communist world. The Soviet Union could not outright condemn it, but they clearly felt that the US and China were both plotting against them. North Korea viewed it as a victory for socialism (under the reasoning that the US had failed in its attempt to isolate China and was forced to come to terms), while North Vietnam, Albania, and Cuba felt that China had made a mistake by negotiating with the enemy. It also had a demoralizing effect on Taiwan, whose leadership had sensed the inevitable, but who were nonetheless upset at not having been consulted first. With the Nixon visit, most anti-American propaganda disappeared in China. The US was still criticized for imperialism, but not to the degree it had been before 1972. Instead, Soviet revisionism and "social imperialism" was now seen as China's main enemy.

In the aftermath of the Lin Biao incident, many officials criticized and dismissed during 1966-1969 were reinstated. Mao abruptly summoned a party congress in August 1973. The 10th Congress formally rehabilitated Deng Xiaoping. This move was suggested by Zhou Enlai, and Mao agreed, deciding that Deng was "70% correct, 30% wrong". Lin Biao was also posthumously expelled from the party. Mao had wanted to use this period as a time to rethink his successor. Mao's wife Jiang Qing, meanwhile, had formed an informal radical political alliance with Shanghai revolution organizer Wang Hongwen, who seems to have gained Mao's favour as a possible successor, as well as Shanghai Revolutionary Committee Chairman Zhang Chunqiao and propaganda writer Yao Wenyuan, all of whom were elevated to the Politburo by the 10th Congress. They were later dubbed the "Gang of Four."

The Gang of Four then attempted to target Zhou Enlai, who was by then ill with bladder cancer and unable to perform many of his duties. They launched the "Criticize Lin Biao, Criticize Confucius" Campaign in 1974 in an attempt to undermine the premier. However, the Chinese populace was tired of useless, destructive campaigns and treated it with apathy. A sign of growing discontent was a large wall poster erected in Guangzhou at the end of 1974 which complained that China had no rule of law and officials were not accountable for their mistakes. Three of the four authors subsequently wrote self-criticisms. One refused and was banished to the countryside for labor reform.

Mao's health was in sharp decline by 1973. He was slowly losing his eyesight and also experienced a variety of heart, lung, and nervous system problems, although his mind remained sharp to the end. Jiang Qing was eager to take over the country as soon as he was gone, but Mao didn't want that. He once said "My wife does not represent me, and her views are not my views."

The ideological struggle between more pragmatic, veteran party officials and the radicals re-emerged with a vengeance in late 1975. The Gang of Four sought to attack their political opponents and rid them one by one. From their failed attempts at defaming popular Premier Zhou Enlai, the Gang launched a media campaign against the emerging Deng Xiaoping, who they deemed to be a serious political challenge. In January 1976, Premier Zhou died of his cancer, prompting widespread mourning. On April 5, Beijing citizens staged a spontaneous demonstration in Tiananmen Square in Zhou's memory at the Qingming Festival, a traditional Chinese holiday to honor the dead. The real purpose of the gathering was to protest the Gang of Four's repressive policies. Police drove the crowd out of the square in an eerie precursor to the events that took place there 15 years later. The Gang of Four succeeded in convincing a gravely ill Mao that Deng Xiaoping was responsible for the incident. As a result, Deng was denounced as a capitalist roader and stripped of his position as vice premier, although he retained his party membership. He went into hiding in the city of Guangzhou, where he was sheltered by the local military commander, who did not care for either the Gang of Four or Mao's newly appointed successor Hua Guofeng . Deng knew that Mao would soon be gone, and that he only needed to wait a short while.

While experiencing a political storm, China was also hit with a massive natural disaster—the Tangshan earthquake, officially recorded at magnitude 7.8 on the Richter Scale, authorities refused large amounts of foreign aid. Killing over 240,000 people, the tremors of the earthquake were felt both figuratively and literally amidst Beijing's political instability. A meteorite also landed in northwestern China, and the authorities told people not to believe as in olden times that these events were omens and signs from the heavens.

Urban–rural divide
The urban–rural divide was the most important division in Maoist China when it came to the distribution of food, clothing, housing and health care. Rural status carried no entitlement to a state ration card, wages or social security. As a result, Maoist China is sometimes described as a dual society. The model of development in Mao's China was to develop heavy industry through the exploitation of the rural population. In order to minimize the cost of staple foods for the urban population, farmers were compelled to sell any agricultural surplus above a specified level to the state at artificially low prices. In some regions the state also ate into the rural grain supply, causing shortages for the locals. The rural population endured the worst of the Great Leap Famine in part because the state could seize as much grain as it needed, even under starvation conditions. The appropriated grain was largely used to feed the urban population, although some of it was exported.

The difference in treatment of urban and rural areas was a major push factor for internal migration, which lead to increased restrictions on mobility. The ways to acquire an urban hukou were limited, including serving in the People’s Liberation Army, passing the national university entrance examination or being recruited by an urban work unit as a permanent worker. Because of these restrictions, the rural proportion of the population was higher in 1978 than it had been in 1958.

Mao Zedong's legacy
The history of the People's Republic from 1949 to 1976 is accorded the name "Mao era"-China. A proper evaluation of the period is, in essence, an evaluation of Mao's legacy. Since Mao's death there has been generated a great deal of controversy about him amongst both historians and political analysts.

Mao's poor management of the food supply and overemphasis on village industry is often blamed for the millions of deaths by famine during the "Mao era". However, there were also positive changes as a result from his management. Before 1949, for instance, the illiteracy rate in Mainland China was 80%, and life expectancy was a meager 35 years. At his death, illiteracy had declined to less than 7%, and average life expectancy had increased by 30 years. In addition, China's population which had remained constant at 400,000,000 from the Opium War to the end of the Civil War, mushroomed more than 700,000,000 as of Mao's death. Under Mao's regime, some argue that China ended its "Century of Humiliation" and resumed its status as a major power on the international stage. Mao also industrialized China to a considerable extent and ensured China's sovereignty during his rule. In addition, Mao tried to abolish Confucianist and feudal norms.

China's economy in 1976 was three times its 1949 size (but the size of the Chinese economy in 1949 was one-tenth of the size of the economy in 1936), and whilst Mao-era China acquired some of the attributes of a superpower such as: nuclear weapons and a space programme; the nation was still quite poor and backwards compared to the Soviet Union, the United States, Japan, or Western Europe. Fairly significant economic growth in 1962-1966 was wiped out by the Cultural Revolution. Other critics of Mao fault him for not encouraging birth control and for creating an unnecessary demographic bump by encouraging the masses, "The more people, the more power", which later Chinese leaders forcibly responded to with the controversial one-child policy. 
The ideology surrounding Mao's interpretation of Marxism–Leninism, also known as Maoism, was codified into China's Constitution as a guiding ideology. Internationally, it has influenced many communists around the world, including third world revolutionary movements such as Cambodia's Khmer Rouge, Peru's Shining Path and the revolutionary movement in Nepal. In practice, Mao Zedong Thought is defunct inside China aside from anecdotes about the CCP's legitimacy and China's revolutionary origins. Of those that remain, Some of Mao's followers regard the Deng Xiaoping reforms to be a betrayal of Mao's legacy.

See also 
 Wage reform in China, 1949–1976

Notes

References

Further reading 
 Catchpole, Brian. A map history of modern China (1976), new maps and diagrams
 
 Chesneaux, Jean  et al. China: The People's Republic, 1949-1976 (1977) by French scholars
 
 Fairbank, John King and Goldman, Merle. China: A New History. 2nd ed. Harvard U. Press, (2006). 640 pp. excerpt pp 343–471.
 Fenby, Jonathan. The Penguin History of Modern China: The Fall and Rise of a Great Power 1850 to the Present (3rd ed. 2019) popular history.
 Garver, John W. China's Quest: The History of the Foreign Relations of the People's Republic (2nd ed. 2018)
 Guillermaz, Jacques. The Chinese Communist Party In Power, 1949-1976 (1977)  excerpt
 Hsü, Immanuel Chung-yueh. The Rise of Modern China, 6th ed. (Oxford University Press, 1999). Detailed coverage of 1644–1999, in 1136pp.
 Kissinger, Henry. On China  (2011)
 Leung, Edwin Pak-wah. Historical dictionary of revolutionary China, 1839-1976 (1992) online free to borrow
 Leung, Edwin Pak-wah.  Political Leaders of Modern China: A Biographical Dictionary (2002)
 Meisner, Maurice. Mao's China and After: A history of the People's Republic (Simon and Schuster, 1999).
 Meisner, Maurice. Mao Zedong: A Political and Intellectual Portrait (Polity, 2006).
 Perkins, Dorothy. Encyclopedia of China: The Essential Reference to China, Its History and Culture. Facts on File, 1999. 662 pp.
 Price, Rohan B.E. Resistance in Colonial and Communist China (1950-1963) Anatomy of a Riot (Routledge, 2020).
 Rummel, Rudolph J. China's bloody century: Genocide and mass murder since 1900 (Routledge, 2017).
 Salisbury, Harrison E. The New Emperors: China in the Era of Mao and Deng (1993) 
 Schoppa, R. Keith. The Columbia Guide to Modern Chinese History. Columbia U. Press, 2000. 356 pp.
 
 Spence, Jonathan D. Mao Zedong (1999) 214pp online free to borrow 
 Spence, Jonathan D. The Search for Modern China (1999), 876pp; survey from 1644 to 1990s 
 Wang, Ke-wen, ed. Modern China: An Encyclopedia of History, Culture, and Nationalism. Garland, 1998. 442 pp.
 Zeng, Jinghan. The Chinese Communist Party's capacity to rule: ideology, legitimacy and party cohesion. (Springer, 2015).

Historiography
 Harding, Harry. "The study of Chinese politics: toward a third generation of scholarship." World Politics 36.2 (1984): 284–307.
 Wu, Guo. "Recalling bitterness: Historiography, memory, and myth in Maoist China." Twentieth-Century China 39.3 (2014): 245–268.  online
 Yu, Bin. "The Study of Chinese Foreign Policy: Problems and Prospect." World Politics 46.2 (1994): 235–261.
 Zhang, Chunman. "Review Essay: How to Merge Western Theories and Chinese Indigenous Theories to Study Chinese Politics?." Journal of Chinese Political Science 22.2 (2017): 283–294. online

External links
 Farmers, Mao, and Discontent in China: From the Great Leap Forward to the Present by Dongping Han, Monthly Review, November 2009

 (1949-1976)
Maoist China
 
Totalitarian states